Ammar Habib is a Syrian retired professional football defender who played for the Syria national football team during the 1980s.

Career
Habib won the Syrian Premier League with Tishreen in 1997. He also won the 1987 Mediterranean Games with the national team.

References

1967 births
Living people
Syrian footballers
Association football midfielders
Syria international footballers
Tishreen SC players
1988 AFC Asian Cup players
Competitors at the 1987 Mediterranean Games
Mediterranean Games gold medalists for Syria
Mediterranean Games medalists in football
Syrian Premier League players